"Let It Be Me" is a popular song originally published in French in 1955 as "Je t'appartiens" interpreted by Gilbert Bécaud. It became popular worldwide with an English version by the Everly Brothers and later with the duet by Betty Everett and Jerry Butler.

"Je t'appartiens"
"Je t'appartiens" was recorded by Gilbert Bécaud in 1955, with music by Bécaud and lyrics in French by Pierre Delanoë. It became a hit for Bécaud and in 1956 was re-recorded by Les Compagnons de la chanson.

First English version by Jill Corey
The English language version used lyrics by Manny Curtis and was performed in 1957 by Jill Corey in the television series Climax!  Corey's version, with orchestration by Jimmy Carroll, was released as a single and was moderately successful.

The Everly Brothers version
The Everly Brothers helped to further popularize the song with their 1959 rendition of "Let It Be Me" which reached number 7 on the Billboard Hot 100. The harmony arrangement of this version was often emulated in subsequent remakes. This was the first Everly Brothers single to be recorded in New York, and not in Nashville. The musicians that backed up the brothers on the record included Howard Collins, Barry Galbraith and Mundell Lowe on guitar, Lloyd Trotman on bass, Jerry Allison on drums and Hank Rowland on piano.

Betty Everett and Jerry Butler version 
In 1964, Betty Everett and Jerry Butler released their version of the song. Their version peaked at number 5 on the Billboard Hot 100 chart and topped the Cashbox Soul/R&B charts for three weeks.

Cover versions

1960 – Andy Williams recorded the song for his seventh album, Under Paris Skies.
1965 – The Shadows recorded the song for their fourth album, The Sound of The Shadows.
1965 – Sonny & Cher recorded the song for their debut album, Look at Us.
1965 – Skeeter Davis and Bobby Bare included a recording of the song on their duets album Tunes for Two
1966 – Australian pop star Johnny Young, with his backing band Kompany, released this song on an EP. It was a top 10 hit record in Australia.
1966 – Nancy Sinatra included it on her album How Does That Grab You?
1966 – Manfred Mann on EP Just Like a Woman
1967 – The Sweet Inspirations released their version as a single. The song reached Billboard's R&B chart and also became a minor Hot 100 hit.
1968 – Françoise Hardy recorded a version for her album En anglais
1969 – Glen Campbell and Bobbie Gentry had a top forty Hot 100 hit duet with their version of the song. It also charted on Billboard's country chart.
1969 – Petula Clark included it on her UK album Portrait of Petula.
1969 – The 5th Dimension covered it on their hit album The Age of Aquarius. The song featured lead vocals from Billy Davis Jr.
1969 – Tom Jones included it on his cover album This is Tom Jones.
1970 – Elvis Presley performed a live version on his album On Stage. It later appeared on his compilation album with Royal Philharmonic Orchestra in 2016. The album was titled after the Presley hit, The Wonder of You.
1970 – Bob Dylan covered the song on his double album Self Portrait.
1970 – Roberta Flack made a version for her second album Chapter Two.
1972 – Nina Simone released a version on the 1974 album It Is Finished.
1973 – Mary McCaslin covered it on her sophomore album Way Out West.
1976 – New Trolls released a version on the 1976 album Concerto Grosso n.2.
1980 – Kenny Rogers and Dottie West released a version on the 1980 album Sweet Harmony.
1982 – Willie Nelson recorded the song for his album Always On My Mind and released it as a single.
1994 – Julio Iglesias recorded a version with Art Garfunkel for his album Crazy.
2009 – Rod Stewart recorded a version with Jennifer Hudson for his album Soulbook.
2012 – George Harrison's old demo cover of the song was included in the compilation album, Early Takes: Volume 1.
2014 – Bryan Adams included his version on the Japanese edition of his album Tracks of My Years.
2016 – Mariya Takeuchi released a cover alongside her husband Tatsuro Yamashita.
2022 – Jeff Beck and Johnny Depp released a version on the 2022 album 18.

The Everly Brothers

Betty Everett and Jerry Butler

The Sweet Inspirations

Glen Campbell and Bobbie Gentry

Willie Nelson

References

1955 songs
1957 singles
1959 singles
1964 singles
1969 singles
1982 singles
Songs with lyrics by Manny Curtis
Songs with music by Gilbert Bécaud
Songs written by Pierre Delanoë
The Everly Brothers songs
Betty Everett songs
Jerry Butler songs
Sonny & Cher songs
Nancy Sinatra songs
Glen Campbell songs
Bobbie Gentry songs
The 5th Dimension songs
Bob Dylan songs
Jay and the Americans songs
Roberta Flack songs
Elvis Presley songs
Willie Nelson songs
Rod Stewart songs
Neil Diamond songs
Andy Williams songs
Sweet Inspirations songs
Nancy Wilson (jazz singer) songs
Male vocal duets
Columbia Records singles
Cadence Records singles
Vee-Jay Records singles